The Game Bag is a 1997 Italian war drama film directed by Maurizio Zaccaro.

For his performance Leo Gullotta won the David di Donatello for best supporting actor.

Plot 
In late summer 1991, three Italians reach a hunting reserve in Croatia with a station wagon. They go to deer, but, unaware of what's in store for months, they do not decipher the enigmatic signs that surround them. One of the three is suddenly wounded in the knee by a bullet of unknown provenance, and they end up in a hotel targeted by snipers night and day.

Cast 

Massimo Ghini: Renzo
Paraskeva Djukelova: Rada
Antonio Catania: Paolo
 Leo Gullotta:  Carlo
 Yavor Milushev: Boris
 Giorgio Tirabassi

References

External links

1997 films
Italian war drama films
1990s war drama films
Films set in Croatia
Films directed by Maurizio Zaccaro
Films shot in Bulgaria
Films scored by Pino Donaggio
1997 drama films
Yugoslav Wars films
Works about the Croatian War of Independence
1990s Italian films